Kiran Janjani is an Indian actor who works in Bollywood films and television shows. He is well known for his performance as Vikas Nanda in Life OK's Hum Ne Li Hai- Shapath and as Ujjwal Mishra in &TV's Santoshi Maa. He was last seen in Zee TV's Yeh Teri Galiyan as Arindham Mazumdar.

Biography
Janjani was born in Mumbai on 12 March.

Janjani acted in a number of TV commercials. He studied at Colegio Cosmopolitano de Colombia. He graduated from SVKM's NMIMS, Mumbai. He is married to Ritoo k Jenjani, who is a make up designer. He also acted in Falguni Pathak's Song "Yaad pia ki aane lagi" with Riya Sen and also featured in song "Dil dil nahin raha mera" from Harry Anand's album Chaahat.

Kiran has deep faith in numerology. A numerologist suggested him to change his name multiple times because it may bring bad luck to him. At first he refused to do so, however, after series of incidents he changed his mind. After the birth of their daughter, Kiran legally changed his name to Karanuday Jenjani. "Karanuday" is the name listed in his Janampatri. Although his name is Karanuday now, many of his friends and the industry still refer him as Kiran.

Television

References

External links
 

Indian people
Sindhi people
Indian male film actors
Living people
Year of birth missing (living people)
Indian people of Sindhi descent